Derviçan (also known as Dervician) is a settlement in the former Dropull i Poshtëm municipality, Gjirokastër County, southern Albania. At the 2015 local government reform it became part of the municipality Dropull. It is within the larger Dropull region. The village is inhabited solely by Greeks.

In 1991, the political organization Omonoia was founded in Dervican, by representatives of the Greek national minority.

Demographics
In the 1520 Ottoman tax register the Albanian anthroponyms Gjon and Gjin as well as others are found in the village of Derviçan, which appears in the same register with a fairly large population for the time, with a large influence by Greek culture. Characteristic Albanian anthroponyms include: Jani Gjini, Gjin Spato, Gjon Jorgji, Jorgo Gjoni, Nako Bard(h)i, Jorgo Babi, Mano Çuni, Jani Çuni, Kosta Lula, Mano Shpata, Lluka Prushi, Dhimo Prushi, Jani Dragoi and others.

Notable people 
Lefter Millo (1966-1997), footballer
Spiro Ksera, politician

Gallery

References 

Populated places in Dropull
Greek communities in Albania
Villages in Gjirokastër County
Labëria